Helena Krzemieniewska (1878–1966) was a Polish botanist and microbiologist, noted for studying myxobacteria and myxophyta in soil.

Works

References

1878 births
1966 deaths
Women botanists
Polish women scientists